Liveri is a comune (municipality) in the Metropolitan City of Naples in the Italian region Campania, located about 30 km northeast of Naples.

Liveri borders the following municipalities: Carbonara di Nola, Domicella, Marzano di Nola, Nola, Palma Campania, San Paolo Bel Sito, Visciano.

References

Cities and towns in Campania